China National Highway 311 (G311) runs west from Xuzhou, Jiangsu towards Anhui province, and ends in Xixia County, Henan. It is 748 kilometres in length.

Route and distance

See also 

 China National Highways

Transport in Anhui
Transport in Jiangsu
Transport in Henan
311